Stenanthemum sublineare is a species of flowering plant in the family Rhamnaceae and is endemic to the southwest of Western Australia. It is an erect shrub with sparsely hairy young stems, narrowly egg-shaped to linear leaves, and small clusters of densely hairy, greenish, tube-shaped flowers.

Description
The edges of the leaves are turned down or rolled under, the upper surface more or less glabrous, the lower surface mostly obscured. Flowering occurs from October to December.

Taxonomy and naming
Stenanthemum sublineare was first formally described in 2001 by Barbara Lynette Rye in the journal Nuytsia from specimens collected near Bullsbrook in 1997. The specific epithet (sublineare) means "almost linear", referring to the leaves.

Distribution and habitat
This species grows in woodland, dominated by Banksia attenuata, and is only known from the Swan Coastal Plain near Bullsbrook.

Conservation status
Stenanthemum sublineare is listed as "Priority Two" by the Western Australian Government Department of Biodiversity, Conservation and Attractions, meaning that it is poorly known and from only one or a few locations.

References

sublineare
Rosales of Australia
Flora of Western Australia
Plants described in 2001
Taxa named by Barbara Lynette Rye